Emil Zografski (born 3 February 1968 in Sofia, Bulgaria) is a retired Bulgarian ski jumper. He competed at the 1988 Winter Olympics in Calgary, Alberta, Canada, and at the 1992 Winter Olympics in Albertville, France. He is the father of Vladîmir Zografski.

References

External links
Image of Emil and Vladimir Zografski.

1968 births
Living people
Ski jumpers at the 1988 Winter Olympics
Ski jumpers at the 1992 Winter Olympics
Bulgarian male ski jumpers
Olympic ski jumpers of Bulgaria
Sportspeople from Sofia